Napoleon's hill, actually Jiesia (Pajesys) hill fort mound is located in Kaunas, Lithuania, on the left bank of the Nemunas, between the Panemunė and Railway bridges. It is 63.3 meters high. Since the 19th century, it has been named Napoleon's hill. 

From this hill Napoleon Bonaparte watched his Grande Armée crossing the Neman during the French invasion of Russia on 24/25 June 1812; according to his orders two bridges were built to the left of the Jiesia and one in front of the hill, each 300 m apart.

See also
List of hillforts in Lithuania

References

Sources
 
 https://keturiossostines.lt/en/objektas/jiesios-piliakalnis-su-gyvenviete-vadinamas-napoleono-kalnu

Geography of Kaunas
Hill forts in Lithuania
Buildings and structures in Kaunas